Petrus Bouwer du Plessis (born 13 October 1969) is a South African former cricketer. He played in eight first-class and nine List A matches from 1988/89 to 1997/98.

References

External links
 

1969 births
Living people
South African cricketers
Border cricketers
Eastern Province cricketers
People from Somerset East
Cricketers from the Eastern Cape